Louis Childs Sanford (July 27, 1867 - August 10, 1948) was missionary bishop of San Joaquin, California, in the Episcopal Church in the United States of America.

References 

1867 births
1948 deaths
American Episcopal priests
Episcopal bishops of San Joaquin